Dieter Rauchbach (born 9 April 1934) is a German wrestler. He competed in the men's freestyle light heavyweight at the 1960 Summer Olympics. During the 1950s and 1960s, Rauchbach was an eleven-time national champion, and in 1963, he won the "Master of Sports" in East Germany.

References

External links
 

1934 births
Living people
German male sport wrestlers
Olympic wrestlers of the United Team of Germany
Wrestlers at the 1960 Summer Olympics
Sportspeople from Saxony-Anhalt